Oscar Ludwig Levy (28 March 1867 – 13 August 1946) was a German Jewish physician and writer, now known as a scholar of Friedrich Nietzsche, whose works he first saw translated systematically into English. His was a paradoxical life, of self-exile and exile, and of writing on and (as often taken) against Judaism. He was influenced by the racialist theories of Arthur de Gobineau. He also admired Benjamin Disraeli, two of whose novels he translated into the German language.

Life and career
Levy was born in Stargard in the Province of Pomerania, the son of Ernestina (née Lewy) and Moritz Levy and the brother of Max Levy (*1869, Berlin - 1932) and Emil Elias Levy. He studied medicine in Freiburg, qualifying in 1891. He left the German Empire in 1894, where his father was a banker in Wiesbaden, and lived in the United Kingdom of Great Britain and Ireland.

He apparently discovered, or was more thoroughly converted to, Nietzsche in 1905 or 1906 via a patient. The 18-volume Nietzsche translation he oversaw appeared from 1909 to 1913. His collaborators were Francis Bickley, Paul V. Cohn, Thomas Common, William S. Haussman, J.M. Kennedy, Anthony Ludovici, Maximilian A. Mugge, Maude D. Petre, Horace B. Samuel, Hermann Georg Scheffauer, G.T. Wrench and Helen Zimmern. Ludovici became his most important follower. In general he found little British support, but A.R. Orage was an enthusiast and Levy found an outlet in The New Age.

Subsequently, his life was complicated by having to leave the United Kingdom and his medical practice despite his support for the British side against the Central Powers when World War I broke out. He went back to the German Empire in 1915 and then to Switzerland. Back in the United Kingdom in 1920, he incautiously wrote a preface for an inflammatory political pamphlet by George Pitt-Rivers, The World Significance of the Russian Revolution. He was deported as an alien in 1921. He then lived in the French Third Republic.

Eventually he returned to the United Kingdom. He died in Oxford. He was married to Frieda Brauer. His daughter Maud lived in Oxford, having married the bookseller Albi Rosenthal. His grandson is television sports presenter Jim Rosenthal and his great-grandson is actor Tom Rosenthal.

His papers were in 2004 deposited in the Nietzsche-Haus in Sils Maria.

Works 

  , translated into English by Leonard A. Magnus as The Revival of Aristocracy (Probsthain & Co., 1906)

NB volume order differs between versions 

 , poetry rendered by Paul V. Cohn and Maude D. Petre

 
 
 
  , replacing the shorter article by F. C. S. Schiller in the 1911 edition.

Levy also wrote an introduction to On the tracks of life: the immorality of morality'' (1909) by Leone Gioacchino Sera, translated by J. M. Kennedy.

References

Further reading

External links 

 
 

1867 births
1946 deaths
People from Stargard
Nietzsche scholars
German male writers
Jewish German writers
People from the Province of Pomerania
University of Freiburg alumni
People deported from the United Kingdom
German emigrants to England